Ushi may refer to:

 Ushi, Armenia
 Ushi, Bulgaria
 Ushi Hirosaki, character in the Dutch comedy programme Ushi & Dushi
 USHI, ICAO code for Igrim Airport
 An extinct breed of horse in Japan, see extinct native Japanese horse breeds